Tarleton or Tarlton is a surname. Notable people with the surname include:

Banastre Tarleton (1754–1833), English soldier and politician, designer of the Tarleton helmet
Cullie Tarleton, American businessman and politician
Donald K. Tarlton (born 1943), Canadian businessman
Francis Alexander Tarleton (1841–1920), Irish mathematical physicist
Gael Tarleton (born 1959), American politician
John Tarleton (American settler) (ca. 1808–1895), American rancher
John Tarleton (Royal Navy officer) (1811–1880), British naval officer
Ken Tarleton (1900–1984), Australian rugby union player
Nel Tarleton (1906–1956), English boxer
Richard Tarlton (died 1588), English actor

See also
Tarleton, village in Lancashire, England
Tarlton (disambiguation)